Celaenorrhinus flavocincta is a species of skipper butterfly found in Asia, including Bhutan.

References 

flavocincta